The 2010 America East men's basketball tournament was held from March 4–7 at Chase Arena on the University of Hartford campus. The final was held at Patrick Gym in Burlington, VT on March 13. As winners, the Vermont Catamounts win an automatic berth to the 2010 NCAA Men's Division I Basketball Tournament for the fourth time as a member of the America East conference, and first since 2005. Vermont was given the 16th seed in the West Regional of the NCAA Tournament and will face the #1 seed Syracuse Orange in a game played on March 19. As winners of the regular season championship the Stony Brook Seawolves claimed an automatic berth to the 2010 National Invitation Tournament, seeded at #8, the Seawolves took on #1 seeded Illinois Fighting Illini at home on March 17. The Boston University Terriers also gained a bid to the 2010 CBI, were given the #4 seed in the West Region, and faced the Oregon State Beavers on March 17 in Corvallis, OR.

Bracket and results

Asterisk denotes game ended in overtime

Trivia
Binghamton was initially slated as the #5 seed in the tournament.  However, due to a series of scandals surrounding the program, the Bearcats announced they would sit out the tournament.  According to The New York Times, the conference's other members pressured Binghamton to sit out. Conference commissioner Patrick Nero, however, said the decision was Binghamton's alone. Therefore this led to the original #6 seed Hartford Hawks to become the #5 seed, the #7 seed New Hampshire Wildcats to become #6, and the cancellation of the first-round game between UMBC and Albany who become the #7 and #8 seeds in the tournament.
This was the first time in America East Conference history that the Men's and Women's basketball tournaments were held at the same arena over the same weekend.
It was also the first time the Women's Championship game was not held at a 'neutral site' and was played at the highest remaining seed's home arena.

See also
America East Conference

References

America East Conference men's basketball tournament
2009–10 America East Conference men's basketball season
West Hartford, Connecticut
College basketball tournaments in Connecticut
College basketball tournaments in Vermont
Sports competitions in Burlington, Vermont
Sports competitions in Hartford County, Connecticut